Asperula virgata, the rod-shaped woodruff, is a species of plant in the family Rubiaceae. It is endemic to Turkey, and is found in Erzurum and Artvin provinces. It can be found on limestone scree, between elevations of 700–1,100 m. It is threatened by overgrazing, road construction, dam construction and erosion.

References

virgata
Endemic flora of Turkey
Endangered plants
Taxa named by Eva Schönbeck-Temesy